The fourth series of the British children's television series The Story of Tracy Beaker began broadcasting on 7 October 2004 on CBBC and ended on 5 April 2005. The series follows the lives of the children living in the fictional children's care home of Cliffside, nicknamed by them "The Dumping Ground". It consists of twenty-two, fifteen-minute episodes. It is the fourth series in The Story of Tracy Beaker franchise.

Cast

Main

Guest

Casting
Welsh child actors Deepal Parmar, Craig Roberts and Sophie Borja were cast as siblings Chantal, Rio and Roxy Wellard respectively and Felix Drake took on the role of Wolfie. Vincenzo Pellegrino joined the show, playing head careworker Sid Rooney.

Episodes

Production
Jane Dauncey returned to her role as executive producer for her second and final series. Mia Jupp did not return as producer for this series, but did return in series 5. Instead, she was replaced by Jane Steventon. Filming began shortly after the end of the previous series, in 2004. Delyth Thomas returned for her third series, directing seven episodes alone and three episodes with Keith Washington, who joined the directing team (replacing Laurence Wilson). Replacing Joss Agnew and directing twelve episodes is Jill Robertson.

Mary Morris returned to her head writer position for a fourth series. Holly Lyons, Marvin Close, Ariane Sherine and Abigal Abben-Mensah did not return to write for series 4. They were replaced by Emma Reeves (who would later become head writer), Emma Kennedy, Aileen Gonsalves, Sheila Hyde, Roger Williams, Marianne Levy and writing duo - Gary Lawson & John Phelps. Returning from writing the previous three series are Morris, Laura Summers, Othniel Smith and Andy Walker. Returning from writing the previous two series are Gary Parker and Tracy Brabin while returning from writing series 3 are Simon Nicholson and Dan Anthony. Morris and Summers wrote four episodes each; Reeves wrote two episodes; and Nicholson, Kennedy, Gonsalves, Anthony, Brabin, Hyde, Smith, Williams, Walker, Levy, Parker and writing duo - Gary Lawson & John Phelps wrote one episodes each.

Awards and nominations

Ratings

References

The Story of Tracy Beaker
2004 British television seasons
2005 British television seasons